Meter is an unincorporated community in Westmoreland County, Virginia, United States.

References

Unincorporated communities in Virginia
Unincorporated communities in Westmoreland County, Virginia